175th Brigade may refer to:

 175th Mixed Brigade (Spain)
 175th (2/3rd London) Brigade (United Kingdom)